For a list of all Oldham Athletic players with a Wikipedia article, see :Category:Oldham Athletic A.F.C. players.

Players should be listed in chronological order according to the year in which they first played for the club. Appearances and goals should be for first-team competitive games and include substitute appearances, but exclude wartime matches.

References

Players
 
Oldham Athletic
Association football player non-biographical articles